Major-General Michael Charles Kirkpatrick Halford,  (28 October 1914 – 4 January 1999) was a British Army officer.

Military career
Halford was commissioned into the York and Lancaster Regiment on 30 August 1934. He served as commanding officer of the Hallamshire Battalion of the York and Lancaster Regiment during the Italian campaign of the Second World War for which he was appointed a Member of the Order of the British Empire and a Companion of the Distinguished Service Order.

After the war, he became commander of 147th Infantry Brigade in July 1960, chief of staff at Western Command in July 1963 and General Officer Commanding 43rd (Wessex) Division/District in December 1964 before retiring in February 1967.

He was advanced to Officer of the Order of the British Empire in the 1957 Birthday Honours and served as honorary colonel of the York and Lancaster Regiment from 1966 to 1979.

References

1914 births
1999 deaths
British Army major generals
Companions of the Distinguished Service Order
Officers of the Order of the British Empire
York and Lancaster Regiment officers
Graduates of the Royal Military College, Sandhurst
British Army personnel of World War II